Bruce Leslie Petty, born 23 November 1929 at Doncaster, a suburb of Melbourne, is one of Australia's best known political satirists and cartoonists. He is a regular contributor to Melbourne's The Age newspaper.

His intricate images have been described as "doodle-bombs" for their free-association of links between various ideas, people and institutions. Age journalist Martin Flanagan wrote that Petty "re-invented the world as a vast scribbly machine with interlocking cogs and levers that connected people in wholly logical but unlikely ways."

Work
Petty began working for the Owen Brothers animation studio in Melbourne in 1949, before moving to the UK in 1954. His cartoons were published in The New Yorker, Esquire and Punch.  On his return to Australia in 1961, he worked at first for The (Sydney) Daily Mirror, The Bulletin and The Australian before joining The Age in 1976.

In 1976, the animated film Leisure, of which he was the director, won an Academy Award for the producer Suzanne Baker (the first Australian woman to win an Oscar).  "When I got it, the Oscar went to the producer.  We got a picture of it, a very nice gold-framed picture."  (The Age, 22 June 2004)

He has made a number of other award-winning animated films including Art, Australian History, Hearts and Minds and Karl Marx.

Bruce has also created a number of "machine sculptures" with the most famous being a piece known as "Man Environment Machine" (fondly known as the "Petty Machine") that was a feature piece of the Australian Pavilion at World Expo '85 at Tsukuba, Japan.

In 2007, he received the AFI Best Documentary Director prize for the documentary Global Haywire which he wrote, directed and animated, as well as the Best Documentary Sound prize ; this documentary tries to unravel the global pattern that leads to an understanding of how the world came to be as it is today, and is based on interviews with intellectuals, students and journalists.

Bruce's 2008 book, Petty's Parallel Worlds, is a retrospective collection of editorial cartoons from 1959 to the present, street sketches done on assignment around the world, and etchings.

Those of Petty's cartoons that depict themes such as the economy, international relations or other social issues as complicated interlocking machines (that manipulate, or are manipulated by, people) have been likened to Rube Goldberg machines or Heath Robinson contraptions.

At the 2016 Walkley Awards Petty was recognised with the Most Outstanding Contribution to Journalism award.

Influences
Petty says in the foreword to Parallel Worlds that he is a humanist and Socialist, mentions visiting Nicaragua and Cuba in the early 1960s, and feeling the influence of Colin Wilson's The Outsider.
Also by Charlie Perkins.

Personal life
Petty was first married to ABC journalist and film critic Julie Rigg. They have two sons. In 1988 he married award-winning author Kate Grenville, with whom he has a son and a daughter. He and Grenville have separated, and Petty is now partnered with the bookseller Lesley McKay.

Filmography 

 Hearts and Minds (1968)
 Australian History (1971)
 Art (1974)
 Leisure (1976)
 Magic Arts (1978)
 Karl Marx (1979)
 Megalomedia (1983)
 Movers (1986)
 Money (1998)
 The Mad Century (2000)
 Human Contraptions (2002)
 Global Haywire (2007)

Books
 Australian artist in South East Asia / Bruce Petty with introduction by Ronald Searle (1962)
 Petty's Australia fair / Bruce Petty (1967)
 A portfolio of Petty / Bruce Petty (1969)
 The best of Petty / 1968, Ed. Ron Smith
 The Penguin Petty (1972)
 Petty's Australia: and how it works / Bruce Petty (1976)
 The Petty age / Bruce Petty (1978)
 Petty's money book / Bruce Petty (1983)
 Women and men / Petty (1986)
 Bruce Petty's the absurd machine / Bruce Petty (1997)
 Petty's Parallel Worlds Bruce Petty (2008, Ed. Russ Radcliffe)

References 

 Conversation with Bruce Petty (1972 sound recording) - interviewer, Hazel de Berg
 Interview with Bruce Petty, cartoonist and filmmaker (1996 sound recording) - interviewer, Ann Turner
 Portrait of Bruce Petty (picture) by Virginia Wallace-Crabbe
 Bruce Petty (I), IMDb

Classroom resources
 Cartoon page of The Age newspaper
 Bruce Petty - 27 June 2004 article from The Age
 Three Cartoonists - transcript of Andrew Denton’s ABC interview with cartoonist Bruce Petty, Bill Leak and Patrick Cook
 Review of Global Haywire in The Sydney Morning Herald

1929 births
Living people
The New Yorker cartoonists
Cartoonists from Melbourne
Australian animators
Australian animated film directors
Australian satirists
Australian editorial cartoonists
Directors of Best Animated Short Academy Award winners